Igor Ozim (born 9 May 1931) is a Slovenian classical violinist and pedagogue, based in Salzburg, Austria.

Career
Igor Ozim was born in 1931 in Ljubljana.  He came from a musical family: both parents played the piano and his brother the violin.  At age 5, he started private lessons with Leon Pfeifer, a former student of Otakar Ševčík, at the Academy of Music, Ljubljana.  He entered Pfeifer's class at the Academy when  he was 8.

In 1949 he was awarded a British Council scholarship to study in the United Kingdom.  He spent three months at the Royal College of Music learning the Elgar Violin Concerto in B minor under one of its greatest exponents, Albert Sammons, followed by two years study with Max Rostal.

In 1951 Ozim won the International Carl Flesch Violin Competition, making his Wigmore Hall debut recital shortly afterwards. His concerto debut was the Mendelssohn Violin Concerto in E minor, with the Liverpool Philharmonic Orchestra under Hugo Rignold.

In 1953 he won the ARD International Music Competition in Munich.

Ozim returned to his home country to play many concerts.  He also toured widely through Europe, the Soviet Union, the United States, Australia, New Zealand and the Far East.

He has a repertoire of around 60 violin concertos and many chamber music works. He has given many first performances and been the dedicatee of many works.  The Berlin Philharmonic, the London Philharmonic Orchestra, the London Symphony Orchestra, the BBC Symphony Orchestra and the Warsaw Philharmonic Orchestra are some of the many orchestras he has played with.

He has given master classes in many countries, and is now based at the Mozarteum in Salzburg, Austria.  He has previously taught at the Musikhochschule in Cologne, Germany and the Hochschule der Künste in Berne, Switzerland. His students have included Božena Angelova, Rachel Kolly d'Alba, Lea Birringer, Kurt Sassmannshaus, Peter Tanfield, Olivier Thouin, Patricia Kopatchinskaja, Richard Tognetti, Gwendolyn Masin, as well as current and past leaders of the Berlin Philharmonic, Bavarian Radio Symphony, Zürich Tonhalle Orchestra, Dresden Staatskapelle, Orchestra of the Royal Opera House and many others.

Igor Ozim has made a number of recordings, including contributing to integral recordings of the piano trios of Mozart and the chamber music of Schubert.  He has also recorded violin concertos by his countrymen Slavko Osterc, Lucijan Marija Škerjanc, Ivo Petrić, Janez Matičič and Uroš Krek.

He appears as jury member at noted violin competitions. These have included the Isang Yun Competition 2004 and the International Violin Competition Henri Marteau 2008, 2011 and 2014.

He has produced editions of various works from the classical and contemporary violin repertoire, including the Mozart violin concertos.

References

1931 births
Living people
Musicians from Ljubljana
Slovenian classical violinists
Male classical violinists
Violin pedagogues
Slovenian music educators
Academic staff of Mozarteum University Salzburg
20th-century classical violinists
21st-century classical violinists
20th-century male musicians
21st-century male musicians